Dlhá nad Váhom is a village and municipality in Šaľa District, in the Nitra Region of southwest Slovakia.

Geography
The village lies at an altitude of 118 metres and covers an area of 9.07 km².

History
In historical records the village was first mentioned in 1113.
After the Austro-Hungarian army disintegrated in November 1918, Czechoslovak troops occupied the area, later acknowledged internationally by the Treaty of Trianon. Between 1938 and 1945 Dlhá nad Váhom once more became part of Miklós Horthy's Hungary through the First Vienna Award. From 1945 until the Velvet Divorce, it was part of Czechoslovakia. Since then it has been part of Slovakia.

Population
According to the 2011 census, the municipality had 865 inhabitants. 513 of inhabitants were Hungarians, 335 Slovaks, 7 Czechs and 10 others and unspecified.

See also
 List of municipalities and towns in Slovakia

References

Facilities
The village has a public library and a football pitch.

Genealogical resources

The records for genealogical research are available at the state archive "Statny Archiv in Bratislava, Nitra, Slovakia"

 Roman Catholic church records (births/marriages/deaths): 1693-1890 (parish A)

External links
https://web.archive.org/web/20071116010355/http://www.statistics.sk/mosmis/eng/run.html
http://www.dlhanadvahom.sk/
Surnames of living people in Dlha nad Vahom

Villages and municipalities in Šaľa District
Hungarian communities in Slovakia